The 2009 Mamaia Challenger was a professional tennis tournament played on outdoor red clay courts. It was part of the 2009 ATP Challenger Tour. It took place in Constanța, Romania between 22 and 28 June 2009.

Singles entrants

Seeds

 Rankings are as of June 15, 2009.

Other entrants
The following players received wildcards into the singles main draw:
  Alin-Mihai Constantin
  Adrian-Marin Dăncescu
  Andrei Mlendea
  Andrei Săvulescu

The following players received entry from the qualifying draw:
  Petru-Alexandru Luncanu
  Grzegorz Panfil
  Artem Smirnov
  Ivaylo Traykov

Champions

Singles

 Blaž Kavčič def.  Julian Reister, 3–6, 6–3, 6–4

Doubles

 Adrián García /  David Marrero def.  Adrian Cruciat /  Florin Mergea, 7–6(5), 6–2

References
Official Romanian Tennis Federation website
ITF Search 
2009 Draws

Mamaia Challenger
Clay court tennis tournaments
Tennis tournaments in Romania
2009 in Romanian tennis